Roaring Days is the second studio album released by Australian rock band Weddings Parties Anything.  The title of the album was based on the poem, "Roaring Days", by Henry Lawson.

Track listing
All songs written by Mick Thomas, except where noted
 "Industrial Town" - 4:06   
 "Under the Clocks" - 3:29
 "Gun" (Dave Steel) - 3:43  
 "Brunswick" - 2:54
 "Tilting at Windmills" - 2:53
 "Sergeant Small"  (Tex Morton) - 3:13 
 "Sisters of Mercy" - 4:42
 "Roaring Days" - 2:54
 "Say the Word" - 3:21
 "Missing in Action" - 3:07
 "Laughing Boy" (Paul Kelly) - 4:39    
 "Big River" (Dave Steel) - 4:32 
 "Summons in the Morning" - 3:17
 "Morton (Song for Tex)" - 3:18

Personnel

Weddings Party Anything
 Pete Lawler - bass guitar, vocals
 Marcus Schintler - drums, vocals
 Dave Steel - guitar, vocals
 Mick Thomas - guitar, vocals
 Mark Wallace - piano accordion, keyboards, vocals

Additional musicians
 Michael Barclay - vocals ("Under The Clocks")
 Barb Waters - vocals (Tilting At Windmills")
 Anthony Morgan - cello ("Sisters Of Mercy")
 Dave Docker - trumpet ("Missing In Action")
 Mick O'Connor - hammond organ ("Tilting At Windmills")
 Ian McKenzie - tin whistle ("Laughing Boy")
 Jason McDermid - brass ("Industrial Town")
 James Greening - brass ("Industrial Town")
 David Basden - brass ("Industrial Town")

Charts

References

1988 albums
ARIA Award-winning albums
Weddings Parties Anything albums